Virginijus Šeškus (born February 8, 1967) is a Lithuanian basketball coach. He is currently head coach of CBet Jonava of the LKL.

Career 

Virginijus Šeškus was born in Prienai, Lithuania. He trained children in Prienai sports school. Later, he became the head coach of BC Prienai of the secondary basketball league NKL, winning the NKL championship in 2009. Despite significant roster changes, he led his team to two BBL silver medals, two LKL bronze medals and two LKF Cup gold medals over a span of five years. Due to his achievements, Lithuanian basketball giant BC Lietuvos rytas hired him as the head coach in 2014. Due to inconsistent performance and inefficient rotations, he was terminated in February 2015 and later became the assistant coach of the team. He returned to his hometown club BC Prienai in July 2015. During the 2017-18 LKL season, Šeškus coached Ball brothers LiAngelo and LaMelo Ball during their brief stints in Prienai, also dealing with their father, LaVar, behind the scenes. The signing became a huge failure for the club - while Vytautas gained significant exposure, they finished in last place in the LKL. On August 23, 2018, he wrote a letter stating that, after relations soured, the Ball family "started destroying the club, not paying out prize money to the Big Baller Brand tournament winners, etc." Šeškus coached one more season in Prienai, with the team now renamed BC SkyCop, signing strong Lithuanian players, the Lavrinovič twins, Mindaugas Lukauskis and Martynas Gecevičius. Prienai returned to the playoffs that season, before leaving at the end of the year.

Personal life
Šeškus has two sons, Domantas and Edvinas, both of whom play basketball professionally.

References

1967 births
Living people
Lithuanian basketball coaches
People from Prienai